Takab is a city in West Azerbaijan Province, Iran.

Takab may also refer to:
 Takab, alternate name of Takap, Khuzestan Province
 Takab Bandan, Khuzestan Province
 Takab County, in West Azerbaijan Province
 Takab Rural District (disambiguation)
 Takab-e Kuhmish Rural District
 Security Paper Mill (TAKAB)